Jawahar Navodaya Vidyalaya, Jorhat is CBSE affiliated school of Jorhat district of Assam under Shillong region of Navodaya Vidyalaya Samiti (NVS). One of 557 JNV's known for its academics, spread all over India by Government of India. It is located at Titabar about 16 km from Jorhat town.  This school is residence school and all facilities to the students is free of cost.
The entrance test for admission into 6th and 9th class of Jawahar Navodaya Vidyalaya, Jorhat is being conducted by the Navodaya Vidyalaya Samiti. The school syllabus is CBSE pattern. There are classes being conducted from 6th standard to 12th standard.

External links
 JNV (jorhat) Academy

Jawahar Navodaya Vidyalayas in Assam
Schools in Assam
Education in Jorhat district
Jorhat district
1995 establishments in Assam
Educational institutions established in 1995